Nocona can refer to:
 Nokoni, one of the Comanche bands
 Peta Nocona, a Comanche chief
 Nocona, Texas, named after Peta Nocona
 a code name for a 2004 model of an Intel Xeon microprocessor

See also
 Lake Nocona